Helcogramma solorensis, known commonly as the Solor triplefin, is a species of triplefin blenny in the genus Helcogramma. It was described by Fricke in 1997. It is endemic to Solor in East Nusa Tenggara, Indonesia.

References

Solor triplefin
Fish described in 1997